The County of March is a county (a cadastral division) in Queensland, Australia. The county consists of the Noosa area, plus the eastern parts of the Gympie and Fraser Coast regions.

History
March was first created by an Order in Council by the Governor of New South Wales on 30 December 1848. It was named by the Surveyor-General in honour of a medical practitioner based in the area. The county was described in the following terms:

On 7 March 1901, the Governor of Queensland proclaimed new boundaries under the Land Act 1897, which were described as follows:

Parishes 
March is divided into parishes, as listed below:

References

External links

 
 

March